Lee Grant is an American actress.

Lee Grant may also refer to:

Lee Grant (footballer, born 1983), English football player who played for Manchester United
Lee Grant (footballer, born 1985), English footballer who played for Aston Villa
Lee Grant (New Zealand actress) (1931–2016), English-born New Zealand actress and singer
An alias used by Luke Garner from the Shadow Children books

See also
 Mr. Lee Grant, New Zealand pop star